Mark William Ward (born 10 October 1962) is an English former footballer.

Playing career
Ward was born in Huyton, Lancashire, on 10 October 1962, the second eldest of seven children born to Billy and Irene Ward. His father's family originated from County Cork in Ireland. His father was a casual labourer and an accomplished sportsman, and had played reserve team football for Liverpool in the 1953–54 season. Ward was spotted by Everton at an early age, and joined the club's youth team before signing schoolboy forms in 1977. He then signed apprentice forms in 1979. He developed sciatica, but recovered and managed to score the winning goal against PSV Eindhoven in the final of the under-19 youth tournament in Groningen; he was also voted as the player-of-the-tournament. His success in the competition won him a professional contract with Everton. However, he was released without ever playing a first team game at Goodison Park after manager Gordon Lee told him he was too small to play top-flight football; Lee was sacked by Everton just hours after releasing Ward.

Ward signed a two-year contract with Northwich Victoria of the Alliance Premier League after impressing in a trial game, and the club also found him a job in a bakery. He established himself in the first team and scored the winning goal against Football League side Chester City in the first round of the FA Cup at Drill Field in the 1982–83 season. He also scored the winning goal past Dagenham in the semi-finals of the FA Trophy, to book John King's "Vics" a place at Wembley Stadium in the final. They lost 2–1 to Telford United in the final, and Ward spent most of the game as little more than a spectator after being taken out by left-back Tony Turner in the opening stages of the match.

He signed with Second Division club Oldham Athletic, with manager Joe Royle authorising an initial £9,500 transfer fee that would rise to £34,500 after Ward played 25 games for Oldham. He made his debut against Brighton & Hove Albion at Boundary Park on the opening day of the 1983–84 season on 27 August and scored the only goal of the game with a diving header. He went on to feature in the "Latics" every game of the 1983–84 and 1984–85 seasons, scoring 12 goals in 92 league and cup appearances.

Ward was signed by West Ham United manager John Lyall for a £250,000 fee in August 1985. He was signed to replace Paul Allen, who had been sold to Tottenham Hotspur for £400,000 earlier in the summer. He was ever-present on the right wing in his first season, as they finished third in the First Division. However, in subsequent seasons, star strikers Frank McAvennie and Tony Cottee left and West Ham were relegated at the end of 1988–89.

In December 1989, Ward signed for newly promoted Manchester City, who had just appointed Howard Kendall as manager after falling into the relegation zone. Ian Bishop and Trevor Morley signed for West Ham in exchange. Bizarrely, Ward's first six games for City included four against Millwall. City beat them in the league on 30 December 1989 but drew twice with them in the FA Cup before losing the second replay on 15 January 1990. City rose to finish 14th, with Ward scoring his first three goals for City in consecutive games in April.

Playing mainly on the left wing, Ward only missed two games in 1990–91, scoring 13 league and cup goals as City finished fifth. He scored both goals when City beat Sheffield United in the league on 19 January 1991, and then repeated the feat three days later to knock Sheffield United out of the Full Members Cup.

In the summer of 1991, he signed for Everton, rejoining Kendall who had moved in November 1990. Ward stayed for three seasons before moving down the divisions to play for Birmingham City (where he was a player-coach), Huddersfield Town, Ayr United, Wigan Athletic, Dundee, Valur, Altrincham, and Leigh RMI. Whilst at Birmingham he was part of the side that won the 1995 Football League Trophy Final.

Imprisonment
After the end of his football career, he became involved in the supply of cocaine in Liverpool. He was arrested after  of cocaine were found during a raid at a house in Prescot, Merseyside, in May 2005. In October 2005, he was jailed for eight years. He was released from HM Prison Kirkham in May 2009, having served four years in Kirkham and in HM Prison Liverpool.

Personal life
Ward married Jane Spruce in January 1983. They have one daughter.

Statistics
Source:

Honours
Northwich Victoria
FA Trophy runner-up: 1982–83

Birmingham City
Football League Trophy: 1994–95

Individual
PFA Team of the Year: 1994–95 Second Division

References
General
 

Specific

1962 births
Living people
Footballers from Liverpool
English people of Irish descent
English footballers
England semi-pro international footballers
Association football wingers
Everton F.C. players
Northwich Victoria F.C. players
Oldham Athletic A.F.C. players
West Ham United F.C. players
Manchester City F.C. players
Birmingham City F.C. players
Huddersfield Town A.F.C. players
Ayr United F.C. players
Wigan Athletic F.C. players
Dundee F.C. players
Valur (men's football) players
Altrincham F.C. players
Leigh Genesis F.C. players
English expatriate footballers
English expatriate sportspeople in Iceland
Expatriate footballers in Iceland
National League (English football) players
English Football League players
Premier League players
Scottish Football League players
Úrvalsdeild karla (football) players
Northern Premier League players
English football managers
Altrincham F.C. managers
Northern Premier League managers
English people convicted of drug offences
21st-century English criminals
Sportspeople convicted of crimes